JRI may refer to:

 James Richardson International, a Canadian agriculture and food industry company 
 Justice Resource Institute, a Massachusetts-based non-profit agency